Thomas Enqvist was the defending champion, but lost in the second round this year.

Jonas Björkman won the tournament, beating Jan Siemerink in the final, 3–6, 7–6(7–2), 6–2, 6–4.

Seeds

Draw

Finals

Top half

Bottom half

External links
 Main draw

1997 Stockholm Open
1997 ATP Tour